The Great White Pagoda, or Sarira Stupa of Tayuan Temple, is a brick stupa located at Mount Wutai of Wutai County, Shanxi province, China.

History
The stupa was constructed during the Wanli reign of the Ming dynasty (1368–1644 AD), as recorded on a stone tablet there composed by the high minister Zhang Juzheng (1525–1582).

Architectural features

The Sarira Stupa, named after the Sanskrit word sarira meaning 'Buddhist relic', sits on a square base with an archetypal sumeru pedestal. It is roughly 50 m (164 ft) tall, constructed of brick with a lime coating on the outside that gives its white color. The main upper frame of the stupa is shaped as an inverted bowl. The canopy of the stupa sits atop a steeple with thirteen tiers. The canopy and bead crowning the top are all made of gilded copper. The canopy also supports 252 small bells.

Notes

External links

 China.org.cn

Buildings and structures in Shanxi
Stupas in China
Ming dynasty architecture